Martin Luther King station may refer to:

Martin Luther King Jr. station (Los Angeles Metro), an underground light rail station in Los Angeles, California
Dr. Martin Luther King Jr. Plaza station (Metrorail), a rapid transit station in Miami-Dade County, Florida
King Memorial station, a rapid transit station in Atlanta, Georgia
Martin Luther King Boulevard/Mack Avenue station, a light rail station in Detroit, Michigan
Martin Luther King Drive station, a light rail station in Jersey City, New Jersey
MLK Jr. station (Capital MetroRail), a commuter rail station in Austin, Texas
MLK Jr. station (DART), a light rail station in Dallas, Texas
MacGregor Park/Martin Luther King Jr. station, a light rail station in Houston, Texas

See also
Martin Luther King (disambiguation)
King station (disambiguation)
Cecil B. Moore station
Hamilton E. Holmes station